Metakse or Metakse Poghosian, December 23, 1926 – August 10, 2014, Yerevan) was an Armenian poet, writer, translator and public activist. She was a member of the Advisory Board of the Writers Union of Armenia.

Biography 
Born in Artik, Metakse authored many popular books including poem collections (Youth, Female Heart, and A Conversation with the World). In 2006 she published The Woman of the Fate, an anthology of her selected works. Her poetry has been translated into English, French, Japanese, Bulgarian, Serbian, Spanish and other languages by Bella Akhmadulina, Desanka Maksimović, Diana Der Hovanessian and others.
After the 1988 Armenian earthquake she became the vice-president of "Motherhood" benevolent fund, supporting female members of the Armenian Army during the First Nagorno-Karabakh War. She subsequently authored a memoire entitled How I Saw Artsakh.

She was in close relations with the famous Armenian poets Hovhannes Shiraz and Paruyr Sevak. Artem Sargsyan called her "one of the most prominent figures of modern Armenian poetry".

She is the mother of Armenian popular poet Lilit.

Metakse died at the age of 88 in Yerevan on August 10, 2014.

References

1926 births
Armenian women poets
People from Artik
2014 deaths
20th-century Armenian poets
Armenian-language women poets
Armenian-language poets
20th-century women writers
20th-century Armenian women writers
21st-century Armenian women writers
21st-century Armenian writers